Saint-Paterne is a former commune in the Sarthe department in the region of Pays de la Loire in north-western France. On 1 January 2017, it was merged into the new commune Saint Paterne - Le Chevain.

See also
Communes of the Sarthe department

References

Former communes of Sarthe